Auxis is a genus of ocean-dwelling ray-finned bony fish in the family Scombridae, and tribe Thunnini, also known as the tunas.  Auxis, commonly and collectively called the frigate tunas, is one of five genera of tunas which comprise the Thunnini tribe.

Species
There are four extant species in the genus Auxis, which were formerly regarded as two polytypic species, each with two subspecies. In 2021, the extinct species Auxis koreanus was described from the Neogene of South Korea.

Extant species 
 Auxis brachydorax Collette & Aadland, 1996
 Auxis eudorax Collette & Aadland, 1996
 Auxis rochei Risso, 1810 (bullet tuna)
 Auxis thazard Lacépède, 1800 (frigate tuna)

Extinct species 

 Auxis koreanus Nam et al., 2021

Description
They have a strong, fusiform body with a sharpened head. The teeth are small and conical. The two dorsal fins are separated by a wide gap. The pectoral fins are short. They have a dark, blue-black back, the top of the head may be deep purple or almost black. The belly is whitish and without streaks or spots.

Distribution
These fishes are widespread in all tropical and subtropical seas and oceans, and both mentioned species are present in the Mediterranean Sea with their subspecies (A. thazard thazard and A. rochei rochei).

Ecology 
Auxis species are the predominant prey of pelagic gamefish off of the east coast of the United States.

As food
In Japan the two species in the genus are collectively called , and this is also the common genus name. In Japanese cuisine, these fish are processed into , a product much like , though not really used in fine-dining restaurants or as condiment, but as a fish stock ingredient at more budget type popular-dining places, e.g.,  noodle shops.

Although fresh fish might be eaten as sashimi or grilled, it has a lot of dark-red meat, so it is valued much less than the similar  (skipjack tuna). And it degrades quickly so shipment out to market is limited. The frigate tuna is considered superior between the two.

Fossil record

Fossils of Auxis have been found in the Pliocene of Italy and United States (age range: from 5.3 to 3.6 million years ago.).

References

External links

 MNHN

 
Scombridae
Marine fish genera
Taxa named by Georges Cuvier